Holbein is a surname of Germanic origin. It appears to mean "hollow leg" (Hol- + Bein); however, it could also have originally meant "hollow bone" or perhaps even have evolved from Holzbein, which could mean "wooden leg" or "wooden bone".

Some notable people with the surname include:

 Hans Holbein the Elder (1460–1524), German painter
 Hans Holbein the Younger (c. 1497–1543), son of Hans Holbein the Elder, court artist to King Henry VIII of England
 Ambrosius Holbein (1494–1519), German painter, son of Hans Holbein the Elder
 Sigmund Holbein (died 1540), German painter, brother of Hans Holbein the Elder
 Montague Holbein, British cyclist, runner-up of the first Bordeaux–Paris cycle race in 1891

See also
Hohlbein